Šta se zgodi kad se ljubav rodi is a 1984 Yugoslav comedy film directed by Zoran Čalić.

Cast 
 Dragomir Bojanić – Žika
 Marko Todorović – Milan
 Vladimir Petrović – Boba
 Rialda Kadrić – Marija
 Nikola Kojo – Miša
 Gala Videnović – Nataša
 Jelena Žigon – Jelena
 Ljiljana Janković – Vuka
 Ljudmila Lisina – Nataša's mother
 Branko Đurić – Nataša's father

External links 
 

1984 comedy films
1984 films
Serbian comedy films
Yugoslav comedy films
Films set in Yugoslavia
Serbo-Croatian-language films